Crystal Palace was an indoor amusement park inside the Crystal Palace Complex adjacent to the Champlain Place shopping mall in the city of Dieppe, New Brunswick, Canada near Moncton.

On July 31, 2014, Cadillac Fairview announced that Crystal Palace would be permanently closing on September 1, 2014, to make way for New Brunswick's first Bass Pro Shops store.

Information
The park was opened on February 15, 1990. In 1998 the Park was purchased by Cadillac Fairview. The Crystal Palace was considered to be one of the largest amusements indoors in the Canadian Provinces. This amusement park was also in the same building as Cineplex Cinemas, the Chapters bookstore, the Starbucks Café and the Ramada Plaza Hotel. This amusement park included 14 rides and an arcade. This amusement park was located on 499 Paul Street Dieppe, New Brunswick, Canada. In 2015 the Bullet roller coaster was relocated to the Shining Waters amusement park in Cavendish, Prince Edward Island. Several other rides were relocated to Moncton's Magic Mountain water park.

Attractions
The Crystal Palace Amusement Park included 14 rides that included:
Carousel 
Sky Flyer
Pirate's Cove Mini Golf
Wave Swinger
Convoy
Jumpin' Star
Tree House
Crazy Submarine
Climbing Wall
Rio Grande
Red Baron
Krazy Kars
Bullet
Lazer Runner

Token 

Crystal Palace game tokens are 25 mm diameter and brass.

See also
Champlain Place
Dieppe, New Brunswick
Crystal Palace Complex

References

External links

Crystal Palace Official Website
Ramada Hotel, Crystal Palace

Defunct amusement parks in Canada
Buildings and structures in Dieppe, New Brunswick
1990 establishments in New Brunswick
2014 disestablishments in New Brunswick